Johann August Arens (born 10 February 1757 in Hamburg; died 18 August 1806 in Pisa, Italy) was a German architect of classicism, a landscape designer, a painter, and a member of the Royal Prussian Academy of Fine Arts and Mechanical Sciences in Berlin.

Buildings 

 1789-1792: Reconstruction of the Weimar City Palace
 1792-1797: Roman House in the Park an der Ilm in Weimar
 1794-1797: Country house of Baron Caspar Voght in Klein Flottbek, Hamburg
 1800: Cemetery chapel St. Petri in Hamburg
 Country house Duncker in Hamburg-Horn
 1801: Gentz staircase in the Weimar city palace, completed by Heinrich Gentz between 1802 and 1803
 Country house Amsinck
 Country house Mönckeberg
 Country house Eiffe
 Wandsbeker Church (inaugurated in 1800)

References 

18th-century German architects
19th-century German architects
1757 births
1806 deaths
Architects from Hamburg
German male painters
18th-century German painters
18th-century German male artists
19th-century German painters
19th-century German male artists
German landscape architects